Roanoke Marshes Light was a screw-pile lighthouse in North Carolina.

History
Little is recorded about this light, which was replaced in 1955 with an automated light on a shorter tower. It marks the south entrance to the channel through Croatan Sound, to the east of a marshy shoal extending from the western shore. This places it in the deepest bottom in the area.

There was a predecessor light on this site, beginning in 1857. The pictured light, of conventional screw-pile construction, was lit in 1877. When the light was decommissioned, an unsuccessful attempt was made by a private party to move it, but the house was lost in the sound.

In 2004, a replica of the light was dedicated at the Roanoke Island Maritime Museum in Manteo, North Carolina.

References

Lighthouses completed in 1877
Houses completed in 1877
Lighthouses completed in 1857
Lighthouses in North Carolina
Roanoke Island
1857 establishments in North Carolina